This is a list of awards and nominations received by Yoo Jae-suk.


Awards and nominations

Other accolades

Notes

References

Yoo Jae-suk